Trying to Forget may refer to:

Trying to Forget, album by The Be Five
"Trying to Forget", song by Jim Reeves discography#Singles Burnett and Martin
Trying To Forget, song by Danny Flores Flores, Taub 1957